Clearview Regional High School District is a regional public school district serving students in seventh through twelfth grades from the constituent districts of Harrison Township and Mantua Township, two communities in Gloucester County, New Jersey, United States.

As of the 2020–21 school year, the district, comprised of two schools, had an enrollment of 2,292 students and 166.5 classroom teachers (on an FTE basis), for a student–teacher ratio of 13.8:1.

The district is classified by the New Jersey Department of Education as being in District Factor Group "GH", the third-highest of eight groupings. District Factor Groups organize districts statewide to allow comparison by common socioeconomic characteristics of the local districts. From lowest socioeconomic status to highest, the categories are A, B, CD, DE, FG, GH, I and J.

History
Constructed on an  site at a cost of $1.5 million (equivalent to $ million in ), the district's initial high school facility opened in September 1960, with 950 students in seventh through tenth grades. Students from Mantua Township had attended Pitman High School as part of a sending/receiving relationship, while students from Harrison Township were sent on a tuition-basis to Glassboro High School.

Desilets v. Clearview Regional Board of Education, was a case involving the district in which the New Jersey Supreme Court ruled in 1994 that a curricular student newspaper has a lower standard of protection under the First Amendment based on the educational mission of the school.

Schools 
Schools in the district (with 2020–21 enrollment data from the National Center for Education Statistics) are:
Clearview Regional Middle School with 788 students in grades 7 and 8
Pete DeFeo, Principal
Clearview Regional High School with 1,485 students in grades 9-12
Keith Brook, Principal

Administration
Core members of the district's administration are:
John Horchak III, Superintendent
Esther R. Pennell, Business Administrator / Board Secretary

Board of education
The district's board of education, comprised of nine members, sets policy and oversees the fiscal and educational operation of the district through its administration. As a Type II school district, the board's trustees are elected directly by voters to serve three-year terms of office on a staggered basis, with three seats up for election each year held (since 2012) as part of the November general election. The board appoints a superintendent to oversee the day-to-day operation of the district. Seats on the nine-member board are allocated based on population, with five seats assigned to Mantua and four to Harrison Township.

References

External links 
Clearview Regional High School District

Data for Clearview Regional High School District, National Center for Education Statistics

1960 establishments in New Jersey
Harrison Township, New Jersey
Mantua Township, New Jersey
New Jersey District Factor Group GH
School districts in Gloucester County, New Jersey
School districts established in 1960